Optiquest is a line of budget LCD (and formerly CRT) displays  by ViewSonic.

They differ from the main ViewSonic product line in several ways, such as availability of parts  to warranty length.

References

External links 
 Official Website

Display technology companies